8-Aminoquinoline is the 8-amino derivative of quinoline. Often abbreviated AQ, it is a pale yellow solid.   It is structurally analogous to 8-hydroxyquinoline.

Drug derivatives
The derivatives primaquine, tafenoquine and pamaquine have been tested for anti-malaria activity. Primaquine is still used routinely worldwide as part of the treatment of Plasmodium vivax and Plasmodium ovale malaria, although how it prevents malarial recurrences is not, at present, clear.  Tafenoquine was approved for medical use in Australia and in the United States in 2018.

Directing group
The amine functional group is amenable to formation of amides, and thus can serve as a directing group in organic synthesis.

Preparation
The original synthesis of AQ involved nitration of quinoline to give a mixture of the 5- and 8-nitroderivatives, which were separated by distillation and sublimation.  Reduction of the 8-nitro isomer with tin powder in the presence of hydrochloric acid gave the amines.  AQ can also be produced by amination of 8-chloroquinoline.

References

Abandoned drugs
Antimalarial agents
Quinolines